Francis Brian O'Hanlon (born August 24, 1948) was an American college basketball coach who was the head men's basketball coach at Lafayette College from 1995 to 2022.

Born in Philadelphia, Pennsylvania, O'Hanlon played college basketball at Villanova University, from where he graduated in 1970. O 'Hanlon played in an infamous 1970 NCAA Tournament basketball game against Saint Bonaventure, when Bob Lanier was tripped up and injured in a collision with Chris Ford.

He played professional basketball for the Miami Floridians of the ABA in the 1970–71 season despite being a Philadelphia 76ers draft pick in the 8th round of the 1970 NBA draft. He was the only Floridians player whose surname on the back of his jersey didn't need to be embellished with an O' prefix in a publicity stunt for the first game of a Saint Patrick's Day doubleheader versus the Utah Stars at Madison Square Garden in 1971. From 1975 to 1982, O'Hanlon played overseas with Hageby Basket in Sweden.

O'Hanlon was appointed to succeed John Leone as the 21st head coach in Lafayette Leopards men's basketball history on March 13, 1995. He announced on January 21, 2022 his retirement following the conclusion of his 27th season with the Leopards. His final game was an 82–81 overtime home loss to Bucknell at Kirby Sports Center in the Patriot League tournament first round on March 1.

Head coaching record

References

1948 births
Living people
American expatriate basketball people in Israel
American expatriate basketball people in Sweden
American expatriate basketball people in Venezuela
American men's basketball coaches
American men's basketball players
American women's basketball coaches
Basketball coaches from Pennsylvania
College men's basketball head coaches in the United States
Guards (basketball)
High school basketball coaches in the United States
Lafayette Leopards men's basketball coaches
Miami Floridians players
Penn Quakers men's basketball coaches
Philadelphia 76ers draft picks
Temple Owls women's basketball coaches
Villanova Wildcats men's basketball players
Basketball players from Philadelphia